The Keris-class is a series of patrol crafts designed and built for the Royal Malaysian Navy (RMN). The vessels meet the requirements of Malaysia's marine defense by providing the ability to counter low intensity combat such as anti-piracy and border patrol.

Development
A total of 18 ships in two subclasses were ordered from Vosper Ltd in the 1960s to 1970s. Four ships still in service as of 2023. Some of the retired ships was handed over to the Malaysian Maritime Enforcement Agency.

Major operation
The Keris class was the oldest ships still in service in the RMN. These ships were involved in major operations of the Malaysia-Indonesia confrontation and Operation Terumbu to ensure the success of the Spratly Islands conquest.

Ships of the class
Source:

References

Naval ships of Malaysia
Gunboat classes
Royal Malaysian Navy